Donnall may refer to:

Donnall, King of Tara and heir of Donnchad Donn
E. Donnall Thomas (1920–2012). American physician
Robert Sawle Donnall, Anglo-Cornish murderer and inspiration for the story "Jury" by William Robert Hicks

See also
Donnell
McDonnall (disambiguation)
Donnally (disambiguation)
Donnelly (disambiguation)
Donal (disambiguation)